The Harrisburg Senators was originally a name given to several minor league baseball clubs between 1893 and 1952. The name is also currently used by the modern-day team in the Double-A Eastern League, since 1987.

History

Early teams
The first Senators teams can be traced to the Pennsylvania State League, where the team played as the Harrisburg Hustlers, before taking on the Senators name the following year. In 1900, the city fielded a team in the Atlantic League for one season. In 1911, the team was called the Harrisburg Ponies. In 1912, Harrisburg won the first of three Tri-State League championships. In 1915, the Newark Indians of the International League team moved to Harrisburg. The club lasted one year before moving to the New York State League and playing as the Harrisburg Islanders before disbanding in 1917. This left the city without professional baseball for seven years.

First incarnation
In 1924, the first incarnation of the Senators joined the newly formed New York–Penn League which was eventually renamed the Eastern League. Initially, the Senators and most of the other New York–Penn League teams were not affiliated with a Major League Baseball team. In 1925, Joe Munson hit a .400 batting average, a record which stands to this day in Senators history, and 33 home runs, a Senators record that was not broken until 1999. In 1927, the Senators started a five-year campaign with three Eastern league championships, winning titles in 1927, 1928, and 1931. The year 1932 brought the Senators an affiliation with the Boston Braves. The original Harrisburg Senators' reign ended in 1936, when flood waters from the surrounding Susquehanna River ruined their home ballpark, Island Field. The flood effectively ended Eastern League participation for the next 51 years.

Second and third incarnations
Another Senators team, representing Harrisburg and affiliated with the Pittsburgh Pirates, formed four years later in the smaller Interstate League. Like the Senators before it, the team gained success quickly, winning the league title one year later with stars Billy Cox and Dennis Taylor. The success, however, was short lived, as the team moved to nearby York, Pennsylvania to become an incarnation of the York White Roses in 1943. Another team affiliated with the Cleveland Indians was created, but was not as successful. The Interstate League disbanded this Harrisburg team in 1952, and any form of professional baseball was not played in the city for the next 35 years.

Season-by-season

References

Defunct International League teams
Senators
Pittsburgh Pirates minor league affiliates
Cleveland Guardians minor league affiliates
Boston Braves minor league affiliates
Philadelphia Athletics minor league affiliates
Baseball teams established in 1893
Baseball teams disestablished in 1952
1893 establishments in Pennsylvania
1952 disestablishments in Pennsylvania
Defunct baseball teams in Pennsylvania
Defunct Tri-State League teams
Defunct New York–Penn League teams
Defunct Interstate League teams